Old fox is a term used by some Iranians to describe the United Kingdom. Seyyed Ahmad Adib Pishavari is thought to have been the first to use the term in this context. The term is often used in Iranian society, media, and newspapers.

Background 
In Persian and many other traditions, the fox is known as a sly and cunning animal, and therefore has often been used as a metaphor for a cunning person who achieves goals through trickery rather than simply by force. In the context of Persian attitudes to the United Kingdom, the term was first used by the philosopher and poet Adib Pishavari (1844–1930). When Pishavari was young, his father and relatives were killed in the war between the United Kingdom and Afghanistan in 1857–58. He had anti-British feeling and wrote many poems expressing this sentiment. Pishavari often represented the United Kingdom using animal metaphors such as old fox, ominous raven, and venomous viper in his poems. The term "old fox" still remains from that time. An English translation of one of his poems:

Many an ancient house

Was razed after you crept in

You seized lands through your fox games

You have escaped hundred of traps, like an old fox.

Historical context  
Iranians' use of old fox may express personal opposition to the Persian Constitutional Revolution, support for the 1921 coup d'état, tension between the two nations during the Abadan Crisis (which led to British support for the 1953 coup d'état), British opposition to the Iranian Revolution, or allegations that Britain instigated street riots after the 2009 Iranian presidential election.

In 2011, after Britain imposed sanctions on Iran over the latter's nuclear program, Supreme Leader of Iran Ali Khamenei called the British embassy an "evil embassy". 

When the British embassy reopened in 2015, Iranian media and newspapers declared and reported Return of the Fox. Hemayat wrote on its front page "The old fox arrived with its lights turned off", Resalat wrote "No-one is happy with the return of the old fox", and Kayhan wrote "In Iran's eyes, Britain is still the 'old fox'".

See also 
 Great Satan
 Little Satan (Israel title)

References 

Appellations
Anti-British sentiment
Iran–United Kingdom relations
Foxes in human culture
Political slurs